Clemens Schick (born 15 February 1972) is a German actor, model, political activist and human rights advocate.

He has appeared in more than seventy films since 1998, including leading roles in both German and international productions. He has appeared in various major German and international TV productions and series.

He has also played several leading theatre roles in classical plays like William Shakespeare’s Richard III, Friedrich Schiller’s Don Carlos and Tennessee Williams’ Cat on a Hot Tin Roof.

Schick is openly politically active and an active member of the German Social Democratic Party (SPD). He is an active champion of human rights issues and is a committee member of the German Human Rights Watch chapter.

Life
Clemens was born in Tübingen, Germany.  The son of a teacher and a prosecutor, he has four siblings, including a sister and an older brother. He studied at the Hölderlin High School in Stuttgart, from where he graduated in 1992. After his graduation, he enrolled at the Academy of Performing Arts (AdK) in Ulm.

Following one year of studies, the then 22-year-old Clemens decided to leave Germany and headed for France, where he intended to join the monastery of the Taizé Community in Taizé, Saône-et-Loire. After an eight-month stay, however, he returned to Germany, where he enrolled at the Berlin School of Drama. He completed his studies in 1996, having financed his student time with part-time jobs as landscape gardener, bouncer and waiter in restaurants and pubs in Berlin-Mitte and Prenzlauer Berg.

In an interview with Gala magazine in September 2014, Schick came out as a homosexual. He stated that he is not interested in either "gay" or "heterosexual" labels and falls in love with both men and women, but only dates men. In the past he had a few girlfriends, including German actress Bibiana Beglau, who he briefly dated in 2010.  Today, he lives in Kreuzberg in central Berlin.

Theatre career 
An actor with a confessed love for life on the classical stage, Clemens has a long track record of engagements and leading roles in both modern and classic theatre plays, primarily with German theaters.

His career include engagements at Staatsschauspiel Dresden, Schauspiel Frankfurt, Schauspielhaus Wien, Sophiensaelen, Kampnagel, Staatstheater Stuttgart, Schauspielhaus Zurich, Deutsches Schauspielhaus in Hamburg, Schauspielhaus Köln and Schaubühne Berlin,[4] where he performed as 'Orestes' in Hugo von Hofmannsthal's play Elektra in 1999, and 'Major Vershinin' in Three Sisters by Chekhov in 2006.

From 2002 to 2006, he was a regular part of the ensemble at the Schauspielhaus Hannover, where he was seen in, among others, Johann Kresnik's directorial work of Peer Gynt, in a leading role in Cat on a Hot Tin Roof by Tennessee Williams under the direction of Christina Paulhofer, in leading roles in Shakespeare's Richard III and Twelfth Night under the direction of Sebastian Baumgarten, as well as the title role in Friedrich Schiller’s Don Carlos, under the direction of Wilfred Minks. 

In the summer of 2007 and again in 2008, Schick was also to be seen in the role as 'Death' at the Salzburg Festival in Hofmannsthal's Jedermann.

His first solo show, Windows or: Let's imagine Bill Gates as a happy person, a monologue written by Mathias Greffrath, was staged by the Schauspielhaus Hannover in 2010. The play saw Schick in the role as Bill Gates musing with the audience about business, technology, narcissism and life’s moral questions. He later performed in the solo show in the Sophiensäle theatre, and again for German soldiers stationed in Afghanistan.

Cinema and television 
In addition to his theatre work, Schick has acted extensively in both German and international film and TV productions with roles in more than 70 movies and TV series. His work spans from roles in Hollywood productions to independent cinema.

Arguably, his international breakthrough role came in the 21st James Bond movie, Casino Royale (2006), where Schick played alongside Daniel Craig and Eva Green in the role as the bodyguard 'Kratt' of the movie villain 'Le Chiffre' (Mads Mikkelsen).

The opening film of the "Perspective German Cinema" at the Berlinale 2007 was Upright Standing by Hannah Schweier, in which Schick plays the main role of 'Joe'. In 2008, Schick played alongside Alexandra Neldel and Erhan Emre the role of the detective 'Marco Lorenz' in the television series Innocent.

In 2008, he appeared in the French movie Largo Winch II, playing alongside Sharon Stone and Tomer Sisley, in the role as the villain Dragan Lazarevic.

In 2011, Schick with Saralisa Volm performed in the mainly crowdfunded financed erotic film Hotel Desire. The film features scenes of Volm and Schick engaging in unsimulated sex.

In 2013, Schick played in the French two-part TV Mini-Series Le vol des cigognes (or Flight of the Storks), an adaptation of the novel of the same name by Jean-Christophe Grangé. He took the role of the policeman 'Hervé Dumaz', who speaks French, English and German. It was directed by Jan Kounen. In other roles were Harry Treadaway, Perdita Weeks and Rutger Hauer. It was aired in January 2013 by Canal +.

In 2014, Schick joined the cast of Karim Aïnouz’ Brazilian-German drama Praia do Futuro, playing among others alongside Wagner Moura and Jesuita Barbosa. Later that same year, he also appeared in Austrian-German mystery western The Dark Valley, directed by Andreas Prochaska, featuring Sam Riley and Paula Beer.

Soon after, in 2015, Schick appeared in Theresa von Eltz’ German drama 4 Könige, alongside Jella Haase, Jannis Niewöhner and Paula Beer. Also in 2015, he performed in Ericson Core’s action thriller Point Break, with among others Edgar Ramirez, Luke Bracey and Teresa Palmer.

In 2018 he performed in the Finnish-German crime drama series Arctic Circle. Playing alongside Maximillian Brückner, Pihla Viitala and Iina Kuustonen among others, Schick is seen in the role of Marcus Eiben, a multimillionaire CEO of a pharmaceutical company. The series is directed by Hannu Salonen, a Finnish director based in Germany.

More recently, Schick has appeared in the Netflix-produced bio-pic Sergio (2019) about the life of controversial diplomat Sergio Vieira de Mello, alongside Wagner Moura and Ana de Armas. In 2019, he appeared in a leading role in the first german Netflix Original Kidnapping Stella (2019), directed and written by Thomas Sieben and featuring leading roles from Schick, Jella Haase and Max von der Groeben. In 2022 he appears in Dylan Moran sit-com for the BBC Stuck.

Volunteer work and political engagement 
Clemens Schick is openly politically engaged and has been an active member of the Social Democratic Party of Germany (SPD), since 2016. He was actively supporting the SPD-initiated "My Voice for Reason" campaign in 2016.

In 2008, he visited the German contingent ISAF at the locations Masar-e Sharif (Camp Marmal), Kunduz and Feyzabad in Afghanistan. Here he performed his solo show Windows for the troops, and was accompanied by a camera crew, for a documentary by Jobst Knigge which was titled "The Trooper: Clemens Schick plays theatre in Afghanistan". Schick visited the troops again in 2011 and 2012, supporting the German soldiers at Afghan military sites of the German ISAF troops through theatre performances in Masar-i-Sharif and Kabul.

Schick also participated in the "Alliance Against Castor 2010" and signed a call for artists in numerous newspapers, calling on the population to take part in protests against the Castor transport and the extension of the term of German nuclear power plants.

Schick is a member of Human Rights Watch, and sits on the charter's Berlin committee. He is a member of the Bundesverband Schauspiel (BFFS or Federal Association of Acting), and an ambassador for the Hugo Tempelmann Stiftung, a non-profit working to battle HIV in South Africa.

In 1996 and again in 2009, Schick modelled in Paris and Berlin for US photographer Nan Goldin.

In 2018, he was named as a brand ambassador for German luxury brand Montblanc.

Filmography

Film

Television

Other work
In 2016, he was the main actor in the music video for Fritz Kalkbrenner's track "In This Game".

References

External links 

1972 births
Living people
People from Tübingen
German male film actors
German gay actors
German male models
German LGBT artists
21st-century LGBT people
Social Democratic Party of Germany
Human Rights Watch people